The 2002 Peach Bowl featured the Tennessee Volunteers and the Maryland Terrapins.

Game summary

1st half
Maryland scored first on a 1-yard touchdown run from quarterback Scott McBrien giving Maryland a 7–0 lead. In the second quarter, Maryland cornerback Curome Cox returned an interception 54 yards for a touchdown increasing Maryland's lead to 14–0. Tennessee's Alex Walls kicked a 38-yard field goal, to pull Tennessee to 14–3. Maryland's Nick Novak kicked a 48-yard field goal before halftime to put Maryland up 17–3.

2nd half
In the third quarter, Nick Novak kicked a 44-yard field goal making the score 20–3. Scott McBrien scored on a 6-yard touchdown run, increasing the lead to 27–3. Nick Novak's 25 yard field goal made the final score 30–3.

References

Peach Bowl
Peach Bowl
Tennessee Volunteers football bowl games
Maryland Terrapins football bowl games
December 2002 sports events in the United States
Peach Bowl
2002 in Atlanta